Jerry Ahmed Shaib is a lawyer and politician. He was appointed by President Nana Akufo-Addo as the chief executive officer of the Coastal Development Authority.

He holds Bachelor of Arts in Social Sciences (Economics and Sociology) from the University of Cape Coast, Bachelor of Laws and Master of Philosophy in Sociology from the University of Ghana as well as an Executive MBA in Marketing. He was awarded a Qualifying Certificate Law by the Ghana School of Law and called to the Bar in 2010.

Between 2005 and 2008, he worked as the Special Assistant for the former mayor of Accra, Stanley Nii Adjiri Blankson and led various change initiatives driven by the Accra Metropolitan Assembly.

He has also represented Ghana at various for functions on behalf of the Accra Metropolitan Assembly. Most recently he attended a sustainable development program in Liverpool as Ghana's representative.

Before he was elevated to the CEO position in 2018 at CODA, he was the Deputy chief executive officer. He contested on the ticket of the New Patriotic Party for the parliamentary seat of Ablekuma South Constituency in the 2016 parliamentary elections.

References

External links
CODA | Coastal Development Authority - Ghana

Living people
21st-century Ghanaian lawyers
University of Cape Coast alumni
University of Ghana alumni
Ghana School of Law alumni
1976 births